Chief Daddy is a 2018 Nigerian comedy drama film directed by Niyi Akinmolayan, written by Bode Asiyanbi and produced by Mosunmola Abudu and Temidayo Abudu, which was released in December 2018. It starred popular Nollywood actors and actresses Funke Akindele Bello, Kate Henshaw, Nkem Owoh, Joke Silva, Patience Ozokwor, Richard Mofe Damijo and Racheal Oniga.

Premise
Chief Daddy is about a billionaire industrialist, Chief Beecroft, who serves as a benefactor to a large extended family of relatives, household staff and mistresses. He dies suddenly and his will creates a saga amongst his extended families.

Cast

Bisola Aiyeola as Chef Simbi 
Dakore Egbuson-Akande as Remi Castle
Funke Akindele as Tinu Beecroft
Zainab Balogun	as Ireti Beecroft
Shaffy Bello as Nike Wiiliams
Chioma Omeruah as Chuchu
Ini Edo as	Ekanem
 Ihuoma Linda Ejiofor-Suleiman as Justina
Falz as Femi Beecroft
Mawuli Gavor as Damilare Kofi Mensah
Kate Henshaw as Teni Beecroft
Lepacious Bose as Madam Tasty
Richard Mofe-Damijo	as Tega Castle
M.I. Abaga as Mr. X
Beverly Naya as Adaora
Chinedu Ani	as Joro D
Taiwo Obileye as Chief Daddy
Rachel Oniga as Aunty Ajoke
Beverly Osu	as Sandra Bello
Nkem Owoh as Shoffa Donatus
Patience Ozokwor as Madam Pat
Joke Silva as Lady Kay Beecroft
Demi Banwo as Mr. Barnabas
Kayode Freeman as Dr. Bada
Ayo Lijadu	as Prelate Malachi
Nicole Ofoegbu as Dame Esther
Uti Nwachukwu as Dare Edwards
Solomon Bryan as Kasali.

Premiere and release
Chief Daddy was released in Nigeria on December 14, 2018 and in the Netherlands on March 15, 2019 via Netflix. The film was premiered at the Oriental Hotel in Lagos, with over 40 Nollywood movie stars in attendance including Olu Jacobs, Joke Silva and Richard Mofe Damijo.

Company credits and distributors
The film was produced by Ebony Life Films and distributed by Film One Entertainment in Nigeria and Netflix in the Netherlands.

References

2018 films
Films directed by Niyi Akinmolayan
Nigerian comedy-drama films
2018 comedy-drama films
Films shot in Lagos